Anania pulverulenta is a moth in the family Crambidae. It was described by Warren in 1892. It is found in India (Himachal Pradesh).

References

Moths described in 1892
Pyraustinae
Moths of Asia